HMS Damerham was one of 93 ships of the  of inshore minesweepers. Their names were all chosen from villages ending in -ham. The minesweeper was named after Damerham in Hampshire.

On 2 July 1960, while moored in Hong Kong harbour, Damerham was rammed and almost cut in half by the frigate

References

Blackman, R.V.B. ed. Jane's Fighting Ships (1953)

 

Ham-class minesweepers
Royal Navy ship names
1953 ships